Toghon (died 1301), also Toghan, Togon or Tūqān, was the ninth son of Kublai Khan, founder of the Yuan dynasty.

He was granted the title Prince of Zhennan (鎮南王,  "Prince of Suppressing the South") and moved his household to Ezhou in 1284. 

In the next year, he was dispatched to conquer Champa. He demanded from Đại Việt (now modern Vietnam) a route to Champa, which would trap the Champan army from both north and south, but it was rejected by retired emperor Trần Thánh Tông, whom was the de facto ruler of Đại Việt. As a result, Toghon decided to attack Đại Việt. At first he won several victories and captured Thăng Long, the capital of Đại Việt. Trần Thánh Tông had to offer princess An Tư to him to slow down the pace of the Mongol army. Later he was defeated by Trần Hưng Đạo and fled back to Huguang province.

In 1287, he invaded Vietnam again, but, the Mongol Navy was overwhelmed by Trần dynasty in Bạch Đằng river, and he retreated. This ashamed his father who no longer wished to see him again. He moved to Yangzhou in 1291, where he died 10 years later.

Family
Father: Kublai Khan
Mother: Empress Bayaujin
Wife: Unknown
Concubine: An Tư from Annam
Sons:
 Laozhang, Prince of Zhennan (鎮南王 老章; Луужан)
 Togh Bukha, Prince of Zhennan (鎮南王 脫不花, Тобуха)
 Könček Bukha, Prince of Weishun (威順王 寬徹普化; Хонжибуха)
 Temür Bukha, Prince of Huai (淮王 帖木兒不花; Төмөрбуха)
 Mangi, Prince of Wenji (文濟王 蠻子; Манзи)
 Budaširi, Prince of Xuande (宣德王 不答失里; Будшир)

References

1301 deaths
Generals of the Mongol Empire
Yuan dynasty generals
Sons of Kublai Khan